Gerardus "Gerard" de Vries Lentsch (23 November 1883, Nieuwendam, North Holland – 9 July 1973, Oegstgeest) was a sailor from the Netherlands, who represented his native country at the 1928 Summer Olympics in Amsterdam. De Vries Lentsch, as crew member on the Dutch 8 Metre Hollandia, took the 2nd place with helmsman Johannes van Hoolwerff and fellow crew members: Lambertus Doedes, Cornelis van Staveren, Henk Kersken and Maarten de Wit.

Gerard de Vries Lentsch is the older brother of Willem de Vries Lentsch and the uncle of Wim de Vries Lentsch.

Sources
 
 
 

1883 births
1973 deaths
Sportspeople from Amsterdam
Dutch male sailors (sport)
Sailors at the 1928 Summer Olympics – 8 Metre
Olympic sailors of the Netherlands
Medalists at the 1928 Summer Olympics
Olympic medalists in sailing
Olympic silver medalists for the Netherlands